Samuel Farrow (June 8, 1762November 18, 1824) was a U.S. Representative from South Carolina.

Born in Prince William County in the Colony of Virginia in 1762, Farrow moved to South Carolina with his father's family, who settled in Spartanburg District in 1765.
He served in the Revolutionary War.
He studied law.
He was admitted to the bar in 1793 and commenced practice in Spartanburg, South Carolina.
He also engaged in agricultural pursuits near Cross Anchor.
The 24th Lieutenant Governor of South Carolina 1810–1812.

Farrow was elected as a Democratic-Republican to the Thirteenth Congress (March 4, 1813 – March 3, 1815).
He was not a candidate for renomination in 1814.
He resumed the practice of law.
He also engaged in agricultural pursuits.
He served as member of the State house of representatives 1816–1819 and 1822–1823.
He died in Columbia, South Carolina, November 18, 1824.
He was interred in the family burial ground on his plantation, near the battlefield of Musgrove Mill, South Carolina.

Sources

1824 deaths
1762 births
People of South Carolina in the American Revolution
Democratic-Republican Party members of the United States House of Representatives from South Carolina